Adam Bristow is an Australian former professional rugby league footballer who played in the 1990s and 2000s. He played for the Illawarra Steelers and the Western Suburbs Magpies in the Australian Rugby League and NRL competitions. He then played for the Leigh Centurions in England. Bristow played in both Illawarra and Western Suburbs final games in the NRL competition.

Playing career

Illawarra
Bristow made his first grade debut for Illawarra against South Sydney in Round 1 1996 at WIN Stadium.  Bristow would feature sporadically for Illawarra over the next 3 seasons but mainly played reserve grade.  Bristow played in Illawarra's final ever game in the top grade, scoring the last ever try for the club as they lost 25–24 against Canterbury.

Western Suburbs
In 1999, Bristow signed with Western Suburbs and played 11 games for the club in what was also their final season as a stand-alone entity.  Bristow played in the club's last game before their merger with fellow foundation club Balmain.  Bristow played from the bench as Wests were defeated 60-16 by the Auckland Warriors.

Leigh
Bristow played and captained with Leigh until the end of 2003 before retiring and returning to Australia.

References

1973 births
Living people
Australian rugby league players
Illawarra Steelers players
Leigh Leopards captains
Leigh Leopards players
Rugby league players from Sydney
Rugby league second-rows
Western Suburbs Magpies players